Gianmarco Gerevini (born 11 May 1993) is an Italian footballer who plays as a midfielder for U.S. Adriese.

Career
Born in Brescia, Lombardy, Gerevini was a youth product of hometown club Brescia Calcio. In summer 2012 he left the reserve team for Serie C1 club Viareggio in temporary deal. On 1 August 2013 he returned to the Tuscan town along with Nicola Falasco and Davide Ferrari.

On 27 June 2014, few days before the closure of 2013–14 financial year, Gerevini was sold to Bologna for €800,000. However Brescia also simultaneously signed Matteo Boccaccini from Bologna also for €800,000.

On 1 September 2014 Gerevini was signed by Ischia for the first Serie C season since 1978.

On 10 August 2015 he moved to Portuguese club Atlético Clube de Portugal. The club relegated at the end of season from the third division.

References

External links
 AIC profile (data by football.it) 
 

Footballers from Brescia
1993 births
Living people
Italian footballers
Italian expatriate footballers
Brescia Calcio players
F.C. Esperia Viareggio players
Bologna F.C. 1909 players
Atlético Clube de Portugal players
S.C. Olhanense players
S.S. Ischia Isolaverde players
Latina Calcio 1932 players
Serie C players
Serie D players
Liga Portugal 2 players
Association football midfielders
Expatriate footballers in Portugal
Italian expatriate sportspeople in Portugal